Bobbitt's salt is an oxoammonium compound derived from 4-acetamido-2,2,6,6-tetramethylpiperidine.  It contains the tetrafluoroborate anion and is named after the American chemist James M. Bobbitt.

As a less expensive analogue of the N-oxoammonium salt derived from TEMPO, Bobbitt's salt is still mainly used as a catalyst for oxoammonium-catalyzed oxidations.
(7)

References

External links

Tetrafluoroborates
Acetamides
Oxycations